Indian River High School is a high school in the Indian River Central School District in Philadelphia, New York. The High School opened in 1959 as a grade 7–12 facility; currently it serves grades 9–12. The school's students live in several towns and villages located in northern Jefferson County, New York.

Alma mater
A fair river of the northland,
Gladly gave to us our name.
And as time records our history,
We will honor it with fame.
We are planting our traditions;
We’ll defend them valiantly.
Hand in hand, we are united,
INDIAN RIVER, WE LOVE THEE!

References

External links 
 https://www.irhs.ircsd.org/

Public high schools in New York (state)
Schools in Jefferson County, New York
School buildings in Watertown, New York